"Cara Mia" is a song recorded by Swedish singer Måns Zelmerlöw. It was released as the first single from Måns' debut album Stand by For... in Sweden on 28 February 2007 digitally and later released as a CD single. The song served as Måns' Melodifestivalen 2007 entry coming eventual 3rd place behind winners The Ark and Andreas Johnson. The song has been certified 2× platinum in Sweden.

History
On 17 February 2007 Måns competed in the 3rd semi-final of Melodifestivalen 2007 in Örnsköldsvik with the song "Cara Mia", where he qualified for the final in Stockholm on 10 March, at which he won 3rd place in the contest. The single was released digitally in February 2007 and physically a few days later entering the Swedish Singles Chart at number 9 but quickly climbing the charts to number 1 where it spent 4 consecutive weeks, with a total of 36 weeks on the chart and being certified 2× platinum by IFPI. A video clip has been filmed for the single, shots of which can be seen in the last pages of Måns' album booklet for Stand by For....

Track listings

 The acoustic version of "Cara Mia" appears as a hidden track on the album Stand By For...

Chart performance
The single debuted at number 9 on the Swedish Singles Chart but climbed to number 1 after the physical release in March 2007.

Weekly charts

Year-end charts

Certifications

Release history
The single was released officially in Sweden as a digital download and then as a CD single 5 days later. The song was only released digitally in Poland and Finland. The song was never officially released in Bulgaria but charted there from download sales only.

Cover versions
 Russian singer Philip Kirkorov recorded a remake of this song and named it "Queen".
 Slovenian singer Jan Vehar did a cover of a song back in 2015
 Swedish duo Norlie & KKV did a cover of the song on Så mycket bättre in 2022

References

2007 singles
Dance-pop songs
Melodifestivalen songs of 2007
Number-one singles in Sweden
Songs written by Fredrik Kempe
Songs written by Henrik Wikström
Måns Zelmerlöw songs
2007 songs
Warner Music Group singles
English-language Swedish songs